Moscovium is a synthetic element with the symbol Mc and atomic number 115. It was first synthesized in 2003 by a joint team of Russian and American scientists at the Joint Institute for Nuclear Research (JINR) in Dubna, Russia. In December 2015, it was recognized as one of four new elements by the Joint Working Party of international scientific bodies IUPAC and IUPAP. On 28 November 2016, it was officially named after the Moscow Oblast, in which the JINR is situated.

Moscovium is an extremely radioactive element: its most stable known isotope, moscovium-290, has a half-life of only 0.65 seconds. In the periodic table, it is a p-block transactinide element. It is a member of the 7th period and is placed in group 15 as the heaviest pnictogen, although it has not been confirmed to behave as a heavier homologue of the pnictogen bismuth. Moscovium is calculated to have some properties similar to its lighter homologues, nitrogen, phosphorus, arsenic, antimony, and bismuth, and to be a post-transition metal, although it should also show several major differences from them. In particular, moscovium should also have significant similarities to thallium, as both have one rather loosely bound electron outside a quasi-closed shell. Over a hundred atoms of moscovium have been observed to date, all of which have been shown to have mass numbers from 286 to 290.

Introduction

History

Discovery
The first successful synthesis of moscovium was by a joint team of Russian and American scientists in August 2003 at the Joint Institute for Nuclear Research (JINR) in Dubna, Russia. Headed by Russian nuclear physicist Yuri Oganessian, the team included American scientists of the Lawrence Livermore National Laboratory. The researchers on February 2, 2004, stated in Physical Review C that they bombarded americium-243 with calcium-48 ions to produce four atoms of moscovium. These atoms decayed by emission of alpha-particles to nihonium in about 100 milliseconds.

The Dubna–Livermore collaboration strengthened their claim to the discoveries of moscovium and nihonium by conducting chemical experiments on the final decay product 268Db. None of the nuclides in this decay chain were previously known, so existing experimental data was not available to support their claim. In June 2004 and December 2005, the presence of a dubnium isotope was confirmed by extracting the final decay products, measuring spontaneous fission (SF) activities and using chemical identification techniques to confirm that they behave like a group 5 element (as dubnium is known to be in group 5 of the periodic table). Both the half-life and the decay mode were confirmed for the proposed 268Db, lending support to the assignment of the parent nucleus to moscovium. However, in 2011, the IUPAC/IUPAP Joint Working Party (JWP) did not recognize the two elements as having been discovered, because current theory could not distinguish the chemical properties of group 4 and group 5 elements with sufficient confidence. Furthermore, the decay properties of all the nuclei in the decay chain of moscovium had not been previously characterized before the Dubna experiments, a situation which the JWP generally considers "troublesome, but not necessarily exclusive".

Road to confirmation
Two heavier isotopes of moscovium, 289Mc and 290Mc, were discovered in 2009–2010 as daughters of the tennessine isotopes 293Ts and 294Ts; the isotope 289Mc was later also synthesized directly and confirmed to have the same properties as found in the tennessine experiments.

In 2011, the Joint Working Party of international scientific bodies International Union of Pure and Applied Chemistry (IUPAC) and International Union of Pure and Applied Physics (IUPAP) evaluated the 2004 and 2007 Dubna experiments, and concluded that they did not meet the criteria for discovery. Another evaluation of more recent experiments took place within the next few years, and a claim to the discovery of moscovium was again put forward by Dubna. In August 2013, a team of researchers at Lund University and at the Gesellschaft für Schwerionenforschung (GSI) in Darmstadt, Germany announced they had repeated the 2004 experiment, confirming Dubna's findings. Simultaneously, the 2004 experiment had been repeated at Dubna, now additionally also creating the isotope 289Mc that could serve as a cross-bombardment for confirming the discovery of the tennessine isotope 293Ts in 2010. Further confirmation was published by the team at the Lawrence Berkeley National Laboratory in 2015.

In December 2015, the IUPAC/IUPAP Joint Working Party recognized the element's discovery and assigned the priority to the Dubna-Livermore collaboration of 2009–2010, giving them the right to suggest a permanent name for it. While they did not recognise the experiments synthesising 287Mc and 288Mc as persuasive due to the lack of a convincing identification of atomic number via cross-reactions, they recognised the 293Ts experiments as persuasive because its daughter 289Mc had been produced independently and found to exhibit the same properties.

In May 2016, Lund University (Lund, Scania, Sweden) and GSI cast some doubt on the syntheses of moscovium and tennessine. The decay chains assigned to 289Mc, the isotope instrumental in the confirmation of the syntheses of moscovium and tennessine, were found based on a new statistical method to be too different to belong to the same nuclide with a reasonably high probability. The reported 293Ts decay chains approved as such by the JWP were found to require splitting into individual data sets assigned to different tennessine isotopes. It was also found that the claimed link between the decay chains reported as from 293Ts and 289Mc probably did not exist. (On the other hand, the chains from the non-approved isotope 294Ts were found to be congruent.) The multiplicity of states found when nuclides that are not even–even undergo alpha decay is not unexpected and contributes to the lack of clarity in the cross-reactions. This study criticized the JWP report for overlooking subtleties associated with this issue, and considered it "problematic" that the only argument for the acceptance of the discoveries of moscovium and tennessine was a link they considered to be doubtful.

On June 8, 2017, two members of the Dubna team published a journal article answering these criticisms, analysing their data on the nuclides 293Ts and 289Mc with widely accepted statistical methods, noted that the 2016 studies indicating non-congruence produced problematic results when applied to radioactive decay: they excluded from the 90% confidence interval both average and extreme decay times, and the decay chains that would be excluded from the 90% confidence interval they chose were more probable to be observed than those that would be included. The 2017 reanalysis concluded that the observed decay chains of 293Ts and 289Mc were consistent with the assumption that only one nuclide was present at each step of the chain, although it would be desirable to be able to directly measure the mass number of the originating nucleus of each chain as well as the excitation function of the 243Am+48Ca reaction.

Naming
Using Mendeleev's nomenclature for unnamed and undiscovered elements, moscovium is sometimes known as eka-bismuth. In 1979, IUPAC recommended that the placeholder systematic element name ununpentium (with the corresponding symbol of Uup) be used until the discovery of the element is confirmed and a permanent name is decided. Although widely used in the chemical community on all levels, from chemistry classrooms to advanced textbooks, the recommendations were mostly ignored among scientists in the field, who called it "element 115", with the symbol of E115, (115) or even simply 115.

On 30 December 2015, discovery of the element was recognized by the International Union of Pure and Applied Chemistry (IUPAC). According to IUPAC recommendations, the discoverer(s) of a new element has the right to suggest a name. A suggested name was langevinium, after Paul Langevin. Later, the Dubna team mentioned the name moscovium several times as one among many possibilities, referring to the Moscow Oblast where Dubna is located.

In June 2016, IUPAC endorsed the latter proposal to be formally accepted by the end of the year, which it was on 28 November 2016. The naming ceremony for moscovium, tennessine, and oganesson was held on 2 March 2017 at the Russian Academy of Sciences in Moscow.

Predicted properties
Other than nuclear properties, no properties of moscovium or its compounds have been measured; this is due to its extremely limited and expensive production and the fact that it decays very quickly. Properties of moscovium remain unknown and only predictions are available.

Nuclear stability and isotopes

Moscovium is expected to be within an island of stability centered on copernicium (element 112) and flerovium (element 114). Due to the expected high fission barriers, any nucleus within this island of stability exclusively decays by alpha decay and perhaps some electron capture and beta decay. Although the known isotopes of moscovium do not actually have enough neutrons to be on the island of stability, they can be seen to approach the island as in general, the heavier isotopes are the longer-lived ones.

The hypothetical isotope 291Mc is an especially interesting case as it has only one neutron more than the heaviest known moscovium isotope, 290Mc. It could plausibly be synthesized as the daughter of 295Ts, which in turn could be made from the reaction . Calculations show that it may have a significant electron capture or positron emission decay mode in addition to alpha decay and also have a relatively long half-life of several seconds. This would produce 291Fl, 291Nh, and finally 291Cn which is expected to be in the middle of the island of stability and have a half-life of about 1200 years, affording the most likely hope of reaching the middle of the island using current technology. Possible drawbacks are that the cross section of the production reaction of 295Ts is expected to be low and the decay properties of superheavy nuclei this close to the line of beta stability are largely unexplored. The light isotopes 284Mc, 285Mc, and 286Mc could be made from the 241Am+48Ca reaction. They would undergo a chain of alpha decays, ending at transactinide isotopes too light to be made by hot fusion and too heavy to be made by cold fusion. The isotope 286Mc was found in 2021 at Dubna, in the  reaction: it decays into the already-known 282Nh and its daughters.

Other possibilities to synthesize nuclei on the island of stability include quasifission (partial fusion followed by fission) of a massive nucleus. Such nuclei tend to fission, expelling doubly magic or nearly doubly magic fragments such as calcium-40, tin-132, lead-208, or bismuth-209. Recently it has been shown that the multi-nucleon transfer reactions in collisions of actinide nuclei (such as uranium and curium) might be used to synthesize the neutron-rich superheavy nuclei located at the island of stability, although formation of the lighter elements nobelium or seaborgium is more favored. One last possibility to synthesize isotopes near the island is to use controlled nuclear explosions to create a neutron flux high enough to bypass the gaps of instability at 258–260Fm and at mass number 275 (atomic numbers 104 to 108), mimicking the r-process in which the actinides were first produced in nature and the gap of instability around radon bypassed. Some such isotopes (especially 291Cn and 293Cn) may even have been synthesized in nature, but would have decayed away far too quickly (with half-lives of only thousands of years) and be produced in far too small quantities (about 10−12 the abundance of lead) to be detectable as primordial nuclides today outside cosmic rays.

Physical and atomic

In the periodic table, moscovium is a member of group 15, the pnictogens. It appears below nitrogen, phosphorus, arsenic, antimony, and bismuth. Every previous pnictogen has five electrons in its valence shell, forming a valence electron configuration of ns2np3. In moscovium's case, the trend should be continued and the valence electron configuration is predicted to be 7s27p3; therefore, moscovium will behave similarly to its lighter congeners in many respects. However, notable differences are likely to arise; a largely contributing effect is the spin–orbit (SO) interaction—the mutual interaction between the electrons' motion and spin. It is especially strong for the superheavy elements, because their electrons move much faster than in lighter atoms, at velocities comparable to the speed of light. In relation to moscovium atoms, it lowers the 7s and the 7p electron energy levels (stabilizing the corresponding electrons), but two of the 7p electron energy levels are stabilized more than the other four. The stabilization of the 7s electrons is called the inert pair effect, and the effect "tearing" the 7p subshell into the more stabilized and the less stabilized parts is called subshell splitting. For many theoretical purposes, the valence electron configuration may be represented to reflect the 7p subshell split as 7s7p7p. These effects cause moscovium's chemistry to be somewhat different from that of its lighter congeners.

The valence electrons of moscovium fall into three subshells: 7s (two electrons), 7p1/2 (two electrons), and 7p3/2 (one electron). The first two of these are relativistically stabilized and hence behave as inert pairs, while the last is relativistically destabilized and can easily participate in chemistry. (The 6d electrons are not destabilized enough to participate chemically, although this may still be possible in the two previous elements, nihonium and flerovium.) Thus, the +1 oxidation state should be favored, like Tl+, and consistent with this the first ionization potential of moscovium should be around 5.58 eV, continuing the trend towards lower ionization potentials down the pnictogens. Moscovium and nihonium both have one electron outside a quasi-closed shell configuration that can be delocalized in the metallic state: thus they should have similar melting and boiling points (both melting around 400 °C and boiling around 1100 °C) due to the strength of their metallic bonds being similar. Additionally, the predicted ionization potential, ionic radius (1.5 Å for Mc+; 1.0 Å for Mc3+), and polarizability of Mc+ are expected to be more similar to Tl+ than its true congener Bi3+. Moscovium should be a dense metal due to its high atomic weight, with a density around 13.5 g/cm3. The electron of the hydrogen-like moscovium atom (oxidized so that it only has one electron, Mc114+) is expected to move so fast that it has a mass 1.82 times that of a stationary electron, due to relativistic effects. For comparison, the figures for hydrogen-like bismuth and antimony are expected to be 1.25 and 1.077 respectively.

Chemical
Moscovium is predicted to be the third member of the 7p series of chemical elements and the heaviest member of group 15 in the periodic table, below bismuth. Unlike the two previous 7p elements, moscovium is expected to be a good homologue of its lighter congener, in this case bismuth. In this group, each member is known to portray the group oxidation state of +5 but with differing stability. For nitrogen, the +5 state is mostly a formal explanation of molecules like N2O5: it is very difficult to have five covalent bonds to nitrogen due to the inability of the small nitrogen atom to accommodate five ligands. The +5 state is well represented for the essentially non-relativistic typical pnictogens phosphorus, arsenic, and antimony. However, for bismuth it becomes rare due to the relativistic stabilization of the 6s orbitals known as the inert pair effect, so that the 6s electrons are reluctant to bond chemically. It is expected that moscovium will have an inert pair effect for both the 7s and the 7p1/2 electrons, as the binding energy of the lone 7p3/2 electron is noticeably lower than that of the 7p1/2 electrons. Nitrogen(I) and bismuth(I) are known but rare and moscovium(I) is likely to show some unique properties, probably behaving more like thallium(I) than bismuth(I). Because of spin-orbit coupling, flerovium may display closed-shell or noble gas-like properties; if this is the case, moscovium will likely be typically monovalent as a result, since the cation Mc+ will have the same electron configuration as flerovium, perhaps giving moscovium some alkali metal character. Calculations predict that moscovium(I) fluoride and chloride would be ionic compounds, with an ionic radius of about 109–114 pm for Mc+, although the 7p1/2 lone pair on the Mc+ ion should be highly polarisable. The Mc3+ cation should behave like its true lighter homolog Bi3+. The 7s electrons are too stabilized to be able to contribute chemically and hence the +5 state should be impossible and moscovium may be considered to have only three valence electrons. Moscovium would be quite a reactive metal, with a standard reduction potential of −1.5 V for the Mc+/Mc couple.

The chemistry of moscovium in aqueous solution should essentially be that of the Mc+ and Mc3+ ions. The former should be easily hydrolyzed and not be easily complexed with halides, cyanide, and ammonia. Moscovium(I) hydroxide (McOH), carbonate (Mc2CO3), oxalate (Mc2C2O4), and fluoride (McF) should be soluble in water; the sulfide (Mc2S) should be insoluble; and the chloride (McCl), bromide (McBr), iodide (McI), and thiocyanate (McSCN) should be only slightly soluble, so that adding excess hydrochloric acid would not noticeably affect the solubility of moscovium(I) chloride. Mc3+ should be about as stable as Tl3+ and hence should also be an important part of moscovium chemistry, although its closest homolog among the elements should be its lighter congener Bi3+. Moscovium(III) fluoride (McF3) and thiozonide (McS3) should be insoluble in water, similar to the corresponding bismuth compounds, while moscovium(III) chloride (McCl3), bromide (McBr3), and iodide (McI3) should be readily soluble and easily hydrolyzed to form oxyhalides such as McOCl and McOBr, again analogous to bismuth. Both moscovium(I) and moscovium(III) should be common oxidation states and their relative stability should depend greatly on what they are complexed with and the likelihood of hydrolysis.

Like its lighter homologues ammonia, phosphine, arsine, stibine, and bismuthine, moscovine (McH3) is expected to have a trigonal pyramidal molecular geometry, with an Mc–H bond length of 195.4 pm and a H–Mc–H bond angle of 91.8° (bismuthine has bond length 181.7 pm and bond angle 91.9°; stibine has bond length 172.3 pm and bond angle 92.0°). In the predicted aromatic pentagonal planar  cluster, analogous to pentazolate, the Mc–Mc bond length is expected to be expanded from the extrapolated value of 156–158 pm to 329 pm due to spin–orbit coupling effects.

Experimental chemistry
Unambiguous determination of the chemical characteristics of moscovium has yet to have been established. In 2011, experiments were conducted to create nihonium, flerovium, and moscovium isotopes in the reactions between calcium-48 projectiles and targets of americium-243 and plutonium-244. However, the targets included lead and bismuth impurities and hence some isotopes of bismuth and polonium were generated in nucleon transfer reactions. This, while an unforeseen complication, could give information that would help in the future chemical investigation of the heavier homologs of bismuth and polonium, which are respectively moscovium and livermorium. The produced nuclides bismuth-213 and polonium-212m were transported as the hydrides 213BiH3 and 212mPoH2 at 850 °C through a quartz wool filter unit held with tantalum, showing that these hydrides were surprisingly thermally stable, although their heavier congeners McH3 and LvH2 would be expected to be less thermally stable from simple extrapolation of periodic trends in the p-block. Further calculations on the stability and electronic structure of BiH3, McH3, PoH2, and LvH2 are needed before chemical investigations take place. However, moscovium and livermorium are expected to be volatile enough as pure elements for them to be chemically investigated in the near future. The moscovium isotopes 288Mc, 289Mc, and 290Mc may be chemically investigated with current methods, although their short half-lives would make this challenging. Moscovium is the heaviest element that has known isotopes that are long-lived enough for chemical experimentation.

See also

Notes

References

Bibliography

External links

 Uut and Uup Add Their Atomic Mass to Periodic Table
 Superheavy elements
 History and etymology
 Moscovium at The Periodic Table of Videos (University of Nottingham)

 
Chemical elements
Pnictogens
Substances discovered in the 2000s
Synthetic elements